Milen Hristov (born 20 March 1977) is a Bulgarian footballer who is coach at Neftochimic Burgas.

References

External links

1977 births
Living people
Bulgarian footballers
First Professional Football League (Bulgaria) players
Neftochimic Burgas players
PFC Nesebar players
PFC Spartak Varna players
PFC Chernomorets Burgas players
PFC Kaliakra Kavarna players
PFC Svetkavitsa players
Association football midfielders